Hugh de Port (c. 1015 – 1096) was an 11th-century French-English Norman aristocrat. He was believed to have arrived in England from Port-en-Bessin, leaving behind his son who owned land of the bishop of Bayeux in 1133. It is possible that Hugh was the first Norman sheriff of Kent. De Port accumulated a great number of properties, believed to have been no less than 53 at the time of the Domesday Book of 1086, when he held the manor of Bramshill (Bromeselle). He is closely associated with the history of Portsmouth, and most of his estates were based in Hampshire.

Hugh's son and heir was Adam de Port.

References

External links
 Map of lands held by Hugh de Port, PASE Domesday

11th-century English nobility
11th-century French nobility
11th-century English landowners
Norman conquest of England
History of Hampshire
H